Crazy Moon is the fourth album of the hard rock band Crazy Horse, published by RCA Records in 1978. The record was recorded at the Broken Arrow in Redwood City, Kendun Studio in Burbank, Village Records in West Los Angeles, Sound City in Van Nuys (mixed to Woodrow Hill in Hollywood).

Track listing
"She's Hot" (Steve Antoine, Sampedro) - 3:11
"Going Down Again" (Molina) - 3:26
"Lost and Lonely Feelin'" (Sampedro) - 3:10
"Dancin' Lady" (Sampedro, Talbot) - 3:23
"End of the Line" (Molina) - 3:10
"New Orleans" (Ben Keith, Talbot) - 3:11
"Love Don't Come Easy" (Molina) - 3:10
"Downhill" (Sampedro) - 4:15
"Too Late Now" (Sampedro) - 2:54
"That Day" (Talbot) - 3:18
"Thunder and Lightning" (Sampedro, Talbot) - 3:58

Personnel
 Billy Talbot - bass, vocals
 Ralph Molina - drums, vocals
 Frank "Poncho" Sampedro - guitars, vocals

Additional personnel
 Neil Young - guitar, co-producer on 1, 2, 6, 8, 11
 Greg Leroy - guitar
 Michael Curtis - synthesizer
 Bobby Notkoff - violin
 Kenny Walther - trombone 
 Tom Bray - trumpet
 Mike Kowalski - drums
 Jay Graydon - guitar
 Barry Goldberg - piano, keyboards
 Steve Lawrence - saxophone
 Kirby Johnson - producer
 Dan Doyle - art direction, photography
 Richard Heenan - producer, engineer
 David Briggs - engineer, co-producer on 1, 2, 6, 8, 11
 Tim Mulligan - engineer, co-producer on 1, 2, 6, 8, 11
 Bob Bullock - engineer
 Leslie Foster - engineer
 Spellbound Kelly - engineer
 Jackson Schwartz - engineer
 D.C. Snyder - engineer

References

External links
 

1978 albums
Crazy Horse (band) albums
Albums produced by David Briggs (producer)
One Way Records albums